Rest are an instrumental rock group from Cork, Ireland. The group's sound has evolved over the course of their existence to incorporate elements of progressive rock, tech-metal, post-rock, doom, black metal and math rock. The groups sound is characterised by intricate harmonised riffs, complex drum patterns, unconventional song structures, a heavy emphasis on dynamics and alternating time signatures. As well as releasing one album and an EP on Limerick independent record label Out on a Limb Records, the band has also toured Ireland and the United Kingdom, sharing stages with the likes of Isis, Cult of Luna, Oxbow, Baroness, Torche, Zu, Red Sparowes and Explosions in the Sky.

References

External links 
 Rest - Bandcamp
 Rest - Facebook

Irish rock music groups
1999 establishments in Ireland
Musical groups established in 1999
Musical groups from Cork (city)
Musical quartets